Tetraacetylethylenediamine, commonly abbreviated as TAED, is an organic compound with the formula (CH3C(O))2NCH2CH2N(C(O)CH3)2. This white solid is commonly used as a bleach activator in laundry detergents and for paper pulp.  It is produced by acetylation of ethylenediamine.

Use and mechanism of action
TAED is an important component of laundry detergents that use "active oxygen" bleaching agents. Active oxygen bleaching agents include sodium perborate, sodium percarbonate, sodium perphosphate, sodium persulfate, and urea peroxide. These compounds release hydrogen peroxide during the wash cycle, but the release of hydrogen peroxide is  low when these compounds used in temperatures below . TAED was first used in a commercial laundry detergent in 1978 (Skip by Unilever). Currently, TAED is the main bleach activator used in European laundry detergents and has an estimated annual consumption of 75 kt.

Perhydrolysis
TAED reacts with alkaline peroxide via the process called perhydrolysis releasing of peracetic acid. The first perhydrolysis gives triacetylethylenediamine (TriAED) and the second gives diacetylethylenediamine (DAED):

TAED typically provides only two equivalents of peracetic acid, although four are theoretically possible.
Competing with perhydrolysis, TAED also undergoes some hydrolysis, which is an unproductive pathway.

Preparation 
TAED is prepared in a two-stage process from ethylenediamine and acetic anhydride.  The process is nearly quantitative.

Properties 
Powdered TAED is stabilized by granulation with the aid of the sodium salt of carboxymethylcellulose (Na-CMC), which are sometimes additionally coated blue or green. Despite the relatively low solubility of TAED in cool water, (1 g/L at 20 °C), the granulate dissolves rapidly in the washing liquor.

The peroxyacetic acid formed has bactericidal, virucidal and fungicidal properties,  thereby enabling TAED with percarbonate to disinfect and deodorize.

Ecology 
Triacetylethylenediamine is mostly non-toxic and easily biodegradable. TAED and its byproduct DAED have low aquatic ecotoxicity. Triacetylethylenediamine shows a very low toxicity in all exposure routes, is practically non-irritating effect on skin and eye, and does not give any indication of skin sensitization.  It is not mutagenic and not teratogenic. TAED, TriAED and DAED are all completely biodegradable and substantially removed during wastewater treatment.

References

External links
 US Patent 6528470 - Bleaching activator
 HERA RiskAssessment

Cleaning product components
Acetamides